Vladimir Borisovich Shchukin (born 4 April 1952) is a retired Soviet artistic gymnast. He competed at the 1972 Summer Olympics in all artistic gymnastics events and won a silver medal in the team allround competition. Individually, his best achievement was 10th place on the horizontal bar.

References

1952 births
Living people
Soviet male artistic gymnasts
Gymnasts at the 1972 Summer Olympics
Olympic gymnasts of the Soviet Union
Olympic silver medalists for the Soviet Union
Olympic medalists in gymnastics
Medalists at the 1972 Summer Olympics
Universiade medalists in gymnastics
Universiade gold medalists for the Soviet Union
Universiade silver medalists for the Soviet Union
Universiade bronze medalists for the Soviet Union
Medalists at the 1973 Summer Universiade